The Arrondissements of Cameroon are the third-level units of administration in Cameroon. The arrondissements are organised by divisions and sub divisions of each province (now Regions).

As of 2005 (and since 1996) there are 2 urban communities (Douala and Yaoundé) divided into 11 urban districts (5 in Douala and 6 in Yaounde), 9 towns with special status (Nkongsamba, Bafoussam, Bamenda, Limbe, Edéa, Ebolowa, Garoua, Maroua and Kumba), 11 urban communes and 305 rural communes.

The councils are headed by mayors and municipal councillors who are elected. The councils have a responsibility in principle for the management of local affairs under the supervision of the State.

Under Cameroonian law, the councils provide and regulate administrative, economic and social development, define and enforce work practices to increase efficiency and improve the quality of services, promote training and retraining of municipal staff.

The ballot for the election of municipal elections is a mixed system with both a majority system and a proportional representation system. The party which obtains the absolute majority of votes wins all the seats.

If no party receives an absolute majority, the party that obtains the plurality gets half the seats, with the other half allocated in proportion to the votes of each party.

The law requires the parties to take account of the various sociological components of the district, including the representation of ethnic minorities.

Urban municipalities and special urban communities are headed by representatives appointed by decree of President of the Republic of Cameroon, who serve as mayor and the metropolitan chairman.

In urban communities there are urban district headed by elected municipal councils, but whose functions are much reduced than in other iii

List of communes

A-Z

A

B

C

D

E

F

G

H

I

J

K

L

M

N

O

P

R

S

T

W

Y

Z

Sources
Site de la primature - Élections municipales 2002
Contrôle de gestion et performance des services publics communaux des villes camerounaises - Thèse de Donation Avele - Université Montesquieu Bordeaux IV
Charles Nanga, La réforme de l’administration territoriale au Cameroun à la lumière de la loi constitutionnelle n° 96/06 du 18 janvier 1996, Mémoire ENA. "Internet archive version since original link not working July 2017"
Décret n°2007/117 du 24 avril 2007.

External links

 
Subdivisions of Cameroon
Cameroon, Communes
Cameroon 3
Communes, Cameroon
Cameroon geography-related lists